Native to both South and Central America, Cane toads were introduced to Australia in the 1930s and have since become an invasive species and a threat to the continent's native predators and scavengers.

The primary mechanism of impact cane toads have on Australian ecosystems is through poisoning of native species. The parotoid gland on either side of the head of a cane toad produces a secretion containing bufadienolides that is toxic to most animals. This chemical defence does not exist in any native Australian anuran. Consequently, many native animals that prey on anurans experienced significant population decline, immediately following the invasion of the toad species in Australia.

Whilst the invasion of cane toads has had devastating impacts on the populations of native predators in many Australian ecosystems in which the species has spread, it is unlikely that cane toads are solely responsible for the extinction of any native species. Furthermore, many of the populations that initially experienced a decline following the invasion of cane toads, have subsequently been observed to recover. The persistence of these populations suggests that over time, native predator species have adapted to the presence of the cane toad. Native predators may have adjusted to the ubiety of the toxic anuran through learning or as a result of evolutionary selective pressures applied by the invader.

Adaptation through learning

One way in which Australian animals have adjusted to the presence of the cane toad is through learned behavioural adaptations. These phenotypically plastic behavioural modifications are usually induced by conditioned taste aversion.

This form of learning has been observed to occur in native anurophagous predators when the ill-effects caused by consuming a cane toad result in the predator intentionally avoiding the poisonous species in subsequent encounters. Conditioned taste aversion is most effective if the predator is severely affected from consuming a cane toad. However, in many predatory species, detection of toxins through mouthing of a cane toad, is sufficiently unpalatable to induce avoidance behaviour in subsequent encounters. In response to such an undesirable experience, the predator will refrain from attacking objects that display the same visual or chemical cues as the poisonous toad.

Rather than avoiding cane toads, some native species have learnt foraging techniques allowing them to exploit cane toads as a food source. This learnt behaviour has been observed in predators that are more resistant to the cane toad’s toxins including birds and rodents.

Taste aversion learning in carnivorous marsupials

The planigale is a small carnivorous dasyurid marsupial native to Australia. Similarly to other dasyurids, including quolls, planigales that share no evolutionary history with cane toads are highly susceptible to the ill-effects of cane toad toxins. Studies have shown that planigales naïve to the toxicity of cane toads readily attack cane toads but most often survive the encounter due to the precise predation techniques employed by the small marsupial. Planigales will usually immediately reject a cane toad after capture, or consume only the snout of the toad, such that the poisonous parotoid glands remain untouched. Laboratory tests have shown that planigales learn to avoid cane toads after only one or two encounters. Furthermore, planigales were observed to reject palatable non-toxic frog species following an encounter with a cane toad and also avoided attacking any prey item on which the scent of cane toad had been applied. These findings demonstrate the strength of taste aversion learning in planigales with regards to cane toad.

Whilst aversion learning may initially be important to the survival of naïve planigales, studies have shown that planigales in northern Queensland having lived sympatrically with cane toads since their introduction over 60 years ago, may have evolved to tolerate cane toad toxins (see below).

Avoidance of cane toad tadpoles by predatory fish

The highly toxic tadpoles of cane toads represent a threat to native predatory fish. However, some Australian native fish species, which live in sympatry with cane toads and their larvae, have adapted their foraging tactics in response to the presence of cane toad tadpoles. Barramundi and the northern gudgeon trout have been observed to selectively choose their prey items and differentiate between toxic cane toad tadpoles and non-toxic tadpoles of other species.

The toxins present in cane toad tadpoles are concentrated in the skin. Therefore, mouthing of a tadpole is sufficient for most predators to detect its toxicity. In laboratory tests, Barramundi and northern trout gudgeon rejected cane toad tadpoles immediately after capture. After rejection of the cane toad tadpoles, the fish were observed to shake their heads vigorously. This behaviour was not observed when the fish were fed food pellets or tadpoles of non-toxic species, indicating that the unpalatability of cane toad tadpoles most likely leads to their rejection by predatory fish. The two fish species learnt not to prey on cane toad tadpoles after a small number of encounters. Furthermore, most of the fish were able to recognise and avoid the toxic tadpoles, either by visual or chemical cues, several days after their first encounter. With long-term exposure to toad tadpoles and a selection of native tadpoles, northern gudgeon were able to differentiate between the tadpoles of cane toads and native species.

Avoidance learning in frogs

Native Australian frogs have a low tolerance to cane toad toxins. Whilst the relatively small body size of native frog species compared to adult cane toads, prevents native anurophagous species from consuming larger toads, most species will readily prey on small metamorph toads. 
At this ontogenetic stage, cane toads contain the lowest concentration of toxins. Nonetheless, consumption of recently metamorphosed toads by native frogs is often fatal to the predator. Therefore, the invasion of cane toads constitutes a major threat to native anuran populations, especially ground-dwelling species which are most likely to come into contact with the toxic toad species.

Australian marbled frogs have been found to exhibit rapid aversion learning, avoiding predation on edible-sized cane toads subsequently to a previous encounter with the toxic species. Toad-experienced native frogs most likely use both visual and olfactory cues to detect and avoid the toxic species.

In particular, native Australian frog species have been found to avoid the urine scent of adult cane toads. This behaviour is hypothesised to reduce the rate of potentially dangerous encounters with large toads. However, similar avoidance behaviour in frogs naïve to cane toads at the toad invasion front, suggests that frogs may simply seek shelter sites free of unfamiliar scents, rather than learning to directly avoid cane toads from olfactory cues.

Foraging tactics in birds

Birds appear more resistant to cane toad toxins than reptiles or amphibians. As a result, birds are unlikely to be at risk of fatal poisoning from eating cane toads. Therefore, cane toads may represent a novel prey type for scavenging or predatory birds, rather than a significant ecological threat.

However, native raptors and some corvid species have been observed to eat cane toads using learnt foraging techniques to consume only the less toxic body parts of the toad. This behaviour is most likely stimulated by the unpalatability of the toad’s toxins to the birds.

The most notable case of cane toad consumption by birds involves the scavenging of dead ‘road-kill’ toads by raptors including the black kite and the whistling kite. These birds have learned to eat only the tongue of the toad, leaving the rest of the carcass behind. In this way, the raptors minimise the quantity of toxins ingested. This scavenging behaviour is most common during the dry season when prey becomes scarcer. In a test conducted by Beckmann and Shine (2010), kites were found to be twice as likely to scavenge dead cane toads in the dry season than in the wet season. Furthermore, the kites preferred frogs to cane toads and favoured smaller juvenile toads over larger adult toads.

There has been some anecdotal evidence for culturally transmitted predation techniques of cane toads in Torresian crows. Torresian crows appear to have developed a technique to kill and eat cane toads by flipping the toads on their backs and consuming only the internal organs and part of the thighs of the toxic anuran.  It is possible that this predation behaviour is culturally transmitted. Torresian crows may learn how to perform the technique by imitating and replicating the behaviour of conspecifics.

Predation on cane toads does not appear to be as common in wading birds, which are reluctant to prey on the toxic species in any of its ontological stages. Wading birds including the Nankeen night heron, purple swamphen, pied heron and little egret, have been shown to avoid consuming cane toads, most likely as a result their unpalatability.

Consumption of cane toads by native rodent species

Rodents are physiologically adapted to handle many plant and animal toxins. Whilst rodents are capable of taste aversion learning, studies have shown that the introduced black rat as well as native rodent species including the dusky rat, pale field rat, grassland melomys and water rat appear to tolerate cane toad toxins and therefore readily prey on the invasive species.
Laboratory tests showed that the dusky rat and the grassland melomys will eat cane toads even when provided with a non-toxic alternative prey item. However, these rodent species are more likely to consume small metamorph toads than larger juvenile or adult toads. This selection reflects ontogenetic changes in the toxicity of cane toads whereby metamorph toads contain the lowest concentration of toxins.

Adaptation through evolutionary selection

Cane toads were introduced into northern Queensland between 1935 and 1937. The population rapidly expanded and the species spread westwards at an initial rate of approximately 15 km per year. Currently, cane toads continue to extend their geographic range across tropical northern Australia, moving increasingly further west at an accelerated rate of 55 km per year.

At the invasion front, interactions occur between native species and the introduced toad, which lack shared evolutionary history. Naive animals are more likely react to such an encounter in a way that is unfavourable to their fitness. Therefore, the initial inexperience of native species, with regards to the toxicity of cane toads, makes them particularly susceptible to the potential ecological threat posed by the invasive species.

With time however, evolutionary selective pressures exerted on the phenotypes of native species due to the presence of the cane toad, can induce genetically coded adaptive shifts. Over many generations, native species may evolve to be able to tolerate ingesting higher concentrations of toad toxins or develop an innate ability to avoid consuming cane toad toxins. Some snake species have also adapted physiologically in such a way that the likelihood of ingesting lethal quantities of toxin is minimised.

Evolutionary selective adaptations are most likely to occur in native species having lived sympatrically with cane toads over longer periods of time. More importantly, this period of sympatric existence must correspond to many generations in the native species, in order for natural selection to have an effect on population genetics. Consequently, animals with higher reproductive rates and shorter lifespans are more likely to adapt to cane toads through evolutionary selection.

Morphological, behavioural and physiological adaptations in Australian snakes

Cane toads are highly toxic to snakes. Since the arrival of cane toads, the populations of many native snake species have dramatically declined (up to 89% for the death adder). For some native snakes, an attack on a cane toad results is fatal in as many as 50% of encounters.

Snakes have strong negative allometry for head size, meaning that head size is inversely related to body length. Since the maximum gape size of a snake is proportion to the size of its head, larger snakes tend to have reduced gape sizes. Gape size limits the maximum ingestible prey size. Therefore, larger snakes with smaller heads are less likely to consume large cane toads with potentially lethal concentrations of toxin.

Due to the high toxicity of cane toads to snakes, the physiological ability to attack toads represents a significant fitness decrement. Therefore, intraspecific variance in gape size, and hence in the likelihood consuming a lethal dose of toxin, induces a strong selective pressure for snakes with smaller gape sizes.

Data collected over 80 years from red-bellied black snakes and common tree snakes, shows that the body length of these toad-vulnerable species increases with time since exposure to the toxic anuran. Correspondingly, gape size decreases with increasing body length. Conversely, species at a lower risk from cane toads, including the marsh snake and the keelback snake, show no significant morphological variation over time.

The arrival of cane toads has also exerted selection pressures on the feeding behaviour and toxin tolerance of snakes. Red-bellied black snakes from regions where cane toads are well-established, have developed increased resistance to toad toxins. Furthermore, the presence of cane toads has induced genetically based behavioural adaptations in this snake species. Individuals from toad-exposed regions show an innate disfavour for cane toad as prey. These adaptive responses are likely to have occurred in less than 23 black snake generations, demonstrating the strong selection pressures brought by the cane toad.

Increased tolerance of cane toad toxins in planigales
Studies have shown the aversion learning capabilities of planigales (small shrew-like carnivorous marsupials) with regards to avoiding cane toads as prey, upon initial contact with the toxic species. In the longer term, planigale populations exposed to cane toads over many generations have been able to physiologically adapt to the presence of cane toads, exhibiting a higher tolerance to the toad’s toxins.

Cane toads as a novel food source for predatory arthropods

Unlike native frog species which have coevolved alongside native anurophagous predators over millions of years, some of the traits of the relatively recently introduced cane toad are maladapted to avoiding predation from these new predators.

Cane toads are especially poorly suited to avoiding predation by native arthropods, which do not appear to experience any adverse effects from ingesting cane toad toxins. Cane toad metamorphs are particularly vulnerable to attack by meat ants, which have been observed to kill many small toads around waterbodies in tropical northern Australia. Toads are at an increased risk of encountering meat ants compared to native frogs because of their diurnal rather than nocturnal behaviour and their preference for open spaces where the predatory ants are most common. Furthermore, toads fail to effectively detect and evade meat ants, principally due to a maladaptive trait whereby toads adopt a cryptic defence mechanism when attacked. The immobility of cane toads in response to attack is futile to escaping the meat ants, which consume the toads alive. A study by Ward-Fear et al. (2010) found that meat ants could inflict serious injuries to metamorph toads within 5 seconds and attacks resulted in mortality in more than 80% of cases.

A phylogenetically diverse range of other native arthropods including fishing spiders, water beetles, water scorpions and dragonfly nymphs have also been observed to prey on cane toads metamorphs. In particular, dragonfly nymphs and fishing spiders selectively attack toads over native frog species.

References

External links
www.canetoadsinoz.com
Cane toad research from the Shine lab

Fauna of Australia
Antipredator adaptations